Ernest Barnes (1874–1953) was a British mathematician, scientist, liberal theologian, and bishop.

Ernest Barnes may also refer to:
 Ernest Barnes (athlete) (1885–1956), British track and field athlete
 Ernest Barnes (field hockey) (born 1937), New Zealand competitor in field hockey at the 1964 Summer Olympics
 Ernie Barnes (1938–2009), African-American painter and football player
 Ernest Harlington Barnes (1899–1985), member of the Legislative Council of Bermuda